Hat Yai (also Haad Yai or Had Yai) is a city in southern Thailand near the Malaysian border. Hat Yai is the largest city of Songkhla province and is part of the Greater Hat Yai-Songkhla Metropolitan Area (a conurbation with a population of about 800,000), forming the largest metropolitan area in the south, and the third largest metropolitan area of the country. The city is often mistaken for being the provincial capital. In fact, Songkhla is the capital and the center of administration and culture while Hat Yai is the business center.

History
Originally named Khok Samet Chun (โคกเสม็ดชุน, "shore eugenia knoll"), Hat Yai was a small village until the southern railway was built there, making it one of the major rail hubs of the line. The junction which connected the town of Songkhla with the main route was formerly in the U Tapao area, but was later moved to Khok Samet Chun in 1922 when the U Tapao area turned out to be flood-prone. At that time, Khok Samet Chun had only four residents, but thanks to the investments of Khun Niphat Chinnakorn (the railway contractor for the railway line from Nakhon Si Thammarat to Pattani, it quickly grew into a small town.

In 1928, Hat Yai was made a community (chumchon), which was upgraded to a sanitary district (sukhaphiban) on December 11, 1935. In 1938, the municipal administration building was completed. On March 16, 1949, Hat Yai was granted town status (thesaban mueang). As a result of the town's continuing growth, on August 13, 1968, a larger, new municipal administration building was opened. Finally, in 1995, the town was upgraded to city status (thesaban nakhon). There are a total of 102 communities (chumchon), divided into 4 zones.

The name "Hat Yai" is a short version of "mahat yai", meaning big mahat tree, a relative of jackfruits in genus Artocarpus.

Southern violence

As the major economic center of lower southern Thailand, Hat Yai has increasingly become a target of terrorism in the separatist campaign conducted by the Patani United Liberation Organisation and similar radical groups.

On April 3, 2005, bomb attacks were carried out at a Carrefour Hypermarket and Hat Yai International Airport, killing two and injuring dozens.

On September 16, 2006, a series of bomb attacks killed four and injured more than 70. Although no group has claimed responsibility, local separatists are presumed to be responsible.

On March 31, 2012, a car bomb exploded in the Lee Gardens Plaza Hotel, killing at least 5 and injuring hundreds. Both Thai nationals and Malaysian tourists were among the victims. The Royal Thai Army believes that members of the Barisan Revolusi Nasional (BRN)
group carried out the terrorist attack.

On May 6, 2014, two bombs exploded in front of a convenience store and a police station, injuring 9 people.

Transportation

Hat Yai Junction has become the transportation hub of southern Thailand since the railway was constructed. One of the largest railway stations in the south, Hat Yai Railway Station is an international railway station which handles 28 passenger trains per day, including 26 trains served by State Railway of Thailand and 2 trains served by KTMB of Malaysia. Hat Yai is also the hub for local train services in southern Thailand.

Parallel to the railway line is the Asian highway 2. Asian highway 18 originates in Hat Yai and runs south along the east coast of the Malay peninsula.

Hat Yai Bus Terminal is a major transport hub in southern Thailand. It offers bus services that link Hat Yai with nearly every town and city in the southern region as well as other destinations, including Bangkok and Nakhon Ratchasima. Hat Yai also has a minibus terminal which hosts the largest minibus service in southern Thailand. There are also several private minibus services which focus on tourist destinations, including Phuket, Ko Samui, Ko Pha Ngan, Pak Bara Peer in Satun (a gateway to the islands in the southern Andaman Sea), Langkawi, Penang, Kuala Lumpur, and Singapore. The minibus service has gained popularity in recent years as minibuses are considered a faster way to travel.

Hat Yai International Airport (upgraded to an international airport December 1972) is 9 km from downtown, serving destinations throughout Thailand and connecting the city to Kuala Lumpur and Singapore. It is also an important airport for Muslims on pilgrimage to Mecca. The airport is listed as Thailand's fifth busiest airport, serving 4,256,107 passengers in 2018.

Health 
There are two main hospitals in Hat Yai. Hatyai Hospital is operated by the Ministry of Public Health, while Songklanagarind Hospital is a university hospital operated by the Faculty of Medicine, Prince of Songkla University.

Demographics
Demographically, Hat Yai is notable for a higher proportion of Thai Malays and Thai Chinese citizens than other cities of comparable size in other regions of Thailand. The main languages spoken in Hat Yai are Southern Thai dialect and varieties of Songkhla Malay. The population of Hat Yai was 156,802 as of 2019, ranked fourth in the country after Bangkok, Nonthaburi, and Pak Kret.

Education
Prince of Songkla University is the oldest and largest university in southern Thailand. The main campus is near Hat Yai downtown; the campus area covers Hat Yai city and Kho Hong town. This public university is always ranked one of the top national universities. The first and the only private university in southern Thailand, Hatyai University, is also located in the urban area of Hat Yai. In addition, Ramkhamhaeng University's campus is near the international airport.

Hat Yai is also home to several famous high schools, including the country's top ten, Hatyaiwittayalai School (public). Another well-known public school is Hatyaiwittayalaisomboonkulkanya School, the former branch of Hatyaiwittayalai. In addition, there are several popular private schools in greater Hat Yai, including Saengthong Vitthaya School, Thidanukhro School, and PSU Wittayanusorn School.

Climate
Hat Yai has a tropical monsoon climate (Am), which is hot and humid, like other parts of Southern Thailand. Hat Yai has only two seasons; wet and dry. The wet season, which is influenced by monsoon and rain storms, is from April to December, while the sunny dry season is only from January to March.

Shopping

Hat Yai has a reputation for being a shopping destination for both Thais and foreigners. There are numbers of department stores, shopping malls and markets throughout the city. Suntisook Market on Nipat U-tid 1, 2 & 3 roads are among the best-known. Their main products are imported processed food, cosmetics, fabrics, gadgets and electrical appliances. The city's major wet market is located near the railway station. And another one is Kim Yong market on Supasarn Rungsan road.

Kim Yong market (also Gim Yong) is a famous market located in the center of Hat Yai, Songkhla. The market is divided into 2 parts. The first part is a 2-floor building previously called the “Chaloemthai” cinema. The second part is an outdoor market, alongside the road.

The goods in this market are varied and each part of the market is different. On the first floor of the building, there are fresh foods, such as vegetables, meats, certain seafood, groceries, clothes, snacks, and dry foodstuffs. It is well known that Kim Yong Market has many kinds of dry foodstuffs from China and snacks like chocolates and chips from Malaysia. On the second floor, there are electric appliances which are made in Thailand and China. All of these imported goods are inexpensive because they are tax-free. Outside of the building, many shops and stalls can be found along small streets. Most of the shops sell batiks from Indonesia and Muslim clothes while the majority of stalls sell foods and fruits. Moreover, chestnut is another popular product, which visitors prefer to buy. You can notice chestnut stalls easily by the man who roasts the chestnut and by the smell.

Because of the variety of goods in this market, it is able to attract a large number of people, not only local people but also foreigners and travelers. By noticing a lot of shopping bags in their hands and the excitement on their faces, it is not a surprise that this market is considered as the main artery which nourishes the city's economy.
 
The city has two large weekend markets, namely Asian Trade and Greenway, which are both located on Kanchanavanit Road. They mainly sell second-hand products, including clothes, shoes, decor and souvenirs. In addition, there are several large shopping centers in the city, including Diana, Odean, Robinson, Central, Siam Nakharin, Big C, Big C Extra, Tesco Lotus and Makro. By the end of 2013, Central Festival, one of the largest shopping centers in Southern Thailand.

Culture
An important Buddhist temple is Hat Yai Nai Temple or Wat Hat Yai Nai. It is home to the third largest reclining statue on the planet. People travel from all over Thailand just to pay respect to this statue.

Held on the first night of October, Chak Phra is a Buddhist festival specific to the south of Thailand. It is celebrated with Buddha boat processions or sports events like a run up Khao Tang Kuan hill. In September or October at the Chinese Lunar festival, the Thai and Chinese present their offerings to the moon, "queen of the heavens", in gratitude for past and future fortunes.

Hat Yai is also well known for its spectacular celebrations of the Chinese New Year festival. Although Thai elements have been incorporated (for example, Thai pop stars have been invited to perform), the celebration remains distinctively Chinese. “Despite being several generations removed from Hat Yai's original Chinese pioneers, the New Year celebration provides strong evidence that the community is still influenced by and strongly identifies with its Chinese roots.

References

External links

 
 Official Hat Yai City website

Populated places in Songkhla province
Cities and towns in Thailand